Harichand is a town and union council in the Charsadda District of Khyber-Pakhtunkhwa. It is located at 34°23'2"N 71°48'18"E and has an altitude of 381 meters (1253 feet).

A historical location called Harichand has the name of Harichand Singh, a wealthy businessman renowned for his hospitality. The town has a distinctive past since residents think it was crucial to India's independence from British domination. Mahatma Gandhi once traveled to Upper Dir to meet with the Nawab of Dir, along with a few other Congress members. They were attacked by several individuals in Shergarh on the way back, so they decided to take a different path and traveled to Harichand via Dargai Nehr. Before going to Utmanzai Bacha Khan House, now called Wali Bagh, they stayed at Harichand Singh's home.

References

Union councils of Charsadda District
Populated places in Charsadda District, Pakistan